Ambohitompoina is a town and commune in Madagascar. It belongs to the district of Antanifotsy, which is a part of Vakinankaratra Region. The population of the commune was 27,899 in 2018.

Primary and junior level secondary education are available in town. The majority 99% of the population of the commune are farmers.  The most important crop is rice, while other important products are beans, maize and cassava.  Services provide employment for 1% of the population.

Sights
The town is an entrance place of the Marolambo National Park.

References

Populated places in Vakinankaratra